Carter Lake Dam (National ID # CO01650) is a dam in Larimer County, Colorado.

The earthen dam was completed in 1950 by the United States Bureau of Reclamation, with a height of 214 feet, and a length of 1235 at its crest.  It contains offstream storage as part of the Bureau of Reclamation's Colorado-Big Thompson Project for flood control and irrigation.  The dam is owned by the Bureau of Reclamation and operated by the Northern Colorado Water Conservancy District.

The reservoir it creates, Carter Lake Reservoir, has a water surface of 1,100 acres, about eight miles of shoreline, more than 900 acres of surrounding public land, and a capacity of 112,230 acre-feet.  Recreation includes fishing (for rainbow trout, kokanee, brown trout, splake, walleye, yellow perch, bluegill, salmon, largemouth bass, etc.), hunting, boating, camping and hiking.

See also
 List of dams and reservoirs in Colorado
 List of largest reservoirs of Colorado

References

External links

Dams in Colorado
Reservoirs in Colorado
United States Bureau of Reclamation dams
Buildings and structures in Larimer County, Colorado
Earth-filled dams
Dams completed in 1950
Lakes of Larimer County, Colorado